Hristian Foti (born 16 October 2001) is a Bulgarian footballer who played as a defender for Cypriot First Division club Olympiakos Nicosia.

Career
Born in Varna, Bulgaria, to a Greek Cypriot father and a Bulgarian mother, Foti joined Cherno More's youth academy at the age of nine in 2010. In July 2017 he joined the Omonia youth team, making his professional debut against AEK Larnaca on 29 April 2018.

On 5 July 2019, Foti signed with Alki Oroklini.

International career

Youth levels 
Foti was called up for the Bulgarian under-17 team by Viktorio Pavlov for 2017 European Under-17 Championship qualifying matches on 10 and 16 October 2017. He made his debut against Ukraine.

Club statistics

References
5.https://omonoianews.com/podosfairo/2018/07/eikones-apo-tin-apogeymatini-proponisi-sto-quot-ilias-poyllos-quot/attachment/proponisi11july2018-25/ Training. Retrieved 25 July 2018

6. https://balla.com.cy/2019/07/05/anakoinose-ton-foti-apo-tin-omonoia-i-alki/ From Omonoia to Alki. Retrieved 5 July 2019

External links

Hristian Foti at Uefa

2001 births
Living people
Sportspeople from Varna, Bulgaria
Bulgarian footballers
Bulgaria youth international footballers
Cypriot footballers
Cypriot people of Bulgarian descent
Bulgarian people of Greek Cypriot descent
Association football defenders
AC Omonia players
Alki Oroklini players
Cypriot First Division players
Olympiakos Nicosia players